Battle of Stamford may refer to:

 Battle of Stamford (894)
 Battle of Stamford (918)